The Second Schröder cabinet (German: Kabinett Schröder II) was the 19th Government of Federal Republic of Germany in office from 22 October 2002 until 22 November 2005. It succeeded the First Schröder cabinet formed after the 2002 elections. Chancellor Gerhard Schröder, continue the coalition with the Alliance 90/The Greens (Greens) and his Social Democratic Party (SPD). Joschka Fischer (Greens) served as Vice Chancellor of Germany and Federal Minister of Foreign Affairs. The cabinet was succeeded by the First Merkel cabinet following the 2005 elections.

Composition 

|}

References

Schroder II
2002 establishments in Germany
2005 disestablishments in Germany
Gerhard Schröder
Cabinets established in 2002
Cabinets disestablished in 2005
Schroder II